Thiam Diombar (born 31 December 1959 in Walaldé, Brakna Region) is a Mauritanian politician.

He studied at the École Nationale des Services du Trésor (ENST) in Paris. Since February 2011 he is the Finance Minister of Mauritania. He had previously served as Director of the Treasury.

References

1959 births
Government ministers of Mauritania
Living people
People from Brakna Region